The Lake Falcon Dam International Crossing is a bridge across the Rio Grande south of Falcon Lake. The dam connects the United States-Mexico border cities of Falcon Heights, Texas and Nueva Ciudad Guerrero, Tamaulipas. The dam is also known as "Falcon Dam", "Puente San Juan", "Presa Falcón" and "Bordo  Internacional de la Presa".".

Description
The Lake Falcon Dam International Crossing is owned by the United States Government and the Mexican Government. The dam has a two-lane roadway. The border facilities were completed in 1960. The region is known to be dangerous and the border crossing closes at 8:45pm CST.

References

International bridges in Texas
International bridges in Tamaulipas
Buildings and structures in Starr County, Texas
Transportation in Starr County, Texas
Road bridges in Texas